Connectivity may refer to:

Computing and technology
 Connectivity (media), the ability of the social media to accumulate economic capital from the users connections and activities
 Internet connectivity, the means by which individual terminals, computers, mobile devices, and local area networks connect to the global Internet
 Pixel connectivity, the way in which pixels in 2-dimensional images relate to their neighbors.

Mathematics
Connectivity (graph theory), a property of a graph.
 The property of being a connected space in topology.
 Homotopical connectivity, a property related to the dimensions of holes in a topological space, and to its homotopy groups.
 Homological connectivity, a property related to the homology groups of a topological space.

Biology

Neurobiology
Homotopic connectivity - connectivity between mirror areas of the human brain hemispheres.
Brain connectivity
Functional connectivity
Dynamic functional connectivity

Ecology
 Landscape connectivity, the degree to which the landscape facilitates or impedes movement among resource patches.
 Permeability (spatial and transport planning), the extent to which urban forms permit (or restrict) movement of people or vehicles in different directions.

Physics
 Connectivity, a parameter describing the topology of a porous medium.

See also
Connection (disambiguation)
Prayer, connection to the Divine.